Dylan Taylor (born 1960) is a jazz double bassist.

Early career
Dylan studied bass with Al Stauffer, Dennis Sandole, Buster Williams (under an NEA Jazz study Fellowship) and John Pattitucci at City College of New York, where he also studied composition with Mike Holober. In 2013 Taylor's musical score for the film Takao Dancer was premiered at the Tokyo International Film Festival.

Debut album
Taylor produced his album Sweeter for the Struggle.

Discography

As leader
 Sweeter for the Struggle (Miles, 2013) 
 One in Mind (Blujazz, 2017),

As sideman
With Butch Ballard,  Sam Dockery
 Mozaic

With Khan Jamal
 Percussion & Strings (CIMP, 1997)
 Balafon Dance (CIMP, 2002)
 Black Awareness (CIMP, 2005)
 Fire and Water (CIMP, 2007)

References

1960 births
Living people
American jazz cellists
American male jazz musicians
American jazz double-bassists
Male double-bassists
21st-century double-bassists
21st-century American male musicians
21st-century cellists